The Beeson House and Coach House is a Queen Anne style house located at 5810 West Midway Park in Chicago, Illinois, United States.  The house was built in 1892 by Fredrick R. Schock for Fredrick Beeson.  It was designated a Chicago Landmark on January 20, 1999.

References

Houses completed in 1892
Houses in Chicago
Chicago Landmarks